is a Japanese football player currently playing for Kamatamare Sanuki.
He previously played in the Netherlands.

Career statistics
Updated to 23 February 2016.

References

External links

1983 births
Living people
Association football people from Shizuoka Prefecture
Japanese footballers
J1 League players
J2 League players
Japan Football League players
Mito HollyHock players
Shonan Bellmare players
SC Sagamihara players
Kamatamare Sanuki players
Association football defenders